Islam accounts for approximately 8.9% (750,000 people) of the population of the Central African Republic, making it the second most followed organized religion in the country after Christianity (90%). The vast majority of Muslims are Sunni of Maliki school of jurisprudence. Most Central African Muslims live in the north-east, near the border with predominantly Muslim Chad and Sudan.

History 
Islam arrived in Central African Republic in the 17th century as part of the expansion of the Saharan and Nile River slave routes. Islam began spreading in the region around 1870's onwards. Conversion was a varied process that included the presence of Muslim merchants, the economic expansion of sultanates in nearby Sudan and Chad into the area, slave raids, and the cultural proximity of locals with Muslims. The growth of Islam continued during the French colonial period but witnessed setbacks due to a lack of religious intstitutions in the region.

In February 2014, tens of thousands of Muslims fled the Central African Republic for Chad as they felt they were no longer safe in the country.

See also 
 Séléka
 Arab slave trade

References

 
Central African Republic